{{Infobox writer
| name = Jeanne DuPrau| image = 
| caption =
| birth_date = 
| birth_place = San Francisco, California
| nationality = American
| occupation = Novelist
| notableworks = The Books of Ember
| website = 
}}Jeanne DuPrau' (born 1944 in San Francisco, California) is an American writer, best known for The Books of Ember, a series of science fiction novels for young people. She lives in Menlo Park, California.

Works

 The Books of Ember 
 The City of Ember (2003)
 The People of Sparks (2004)
 The Prophet of Yonwood (2006) 
 The Diamond of Darkhold (2008)

 Other Fiction 
 Car Trouble (2005)
 Voyagers: Escape the Vortex (2016)

Nonfiction
 The Earth House Adoption: The Facts, Feelings, and Issues of a Double Heritage Cells Cloning Daily Life in the American ColoniesShort stories
 "Pearl's Fateful Wish" included in the young adult short story collection What You Wish For, published September 2011.

Film adaptations

A film adaptation of The City of Ember, called City of Ember'', was released in October 2008. It was filmed in Belfast, Northern Ireland and stars Bill Murray as the Mayor of Ember, Saoirse Ronan, Harry Treadaway, Tim Robbins and Martin Landau.

References

External links

 
 
 

20th-century American novelists
Living people
1944 births
People from Menlo Park, California
21st-century American novelists
American children's writers
American women novelists
20th-century American women writers
21st-century American women writers
Writers of young adult science fiction
Novelists from California
Women science fiction and fantasy writers